Robert Gilmour "Gloomy Gil" Dobie (January 21, 1878 – December 23, 1948) was an American football player and coach.

Dobie's Cornell teams of 1921, 1922, and 1923 have been recognized as national champions.  Dobie was also the head basketball coach at North Dakota Agricultural for two seasons from 1906 to 1908, tallying a mark of 17–5.  He was inducted into the College Football Hall of Fame as a coach in 1951. Dobie reached 100 career wins in 108 games, which stood as the NCAA record for the fewest games needed to reach 100 wins from 1921 to 2014.

Early life and playing career
Dobie was born in Hastings, Minnesota.  He played football as an end and quarterback at the University of Minnesota.

Coaching career
Dobie achieved his greatest success at the University of Washington in Seattle, where he had a    During his tenure, Washington had a forty-game winning streak, which is the second longest in NCAA Division I-A/FBS history. His coaching career at Washington also comprised virtually all of Washington's 64-game unbeaten streak — still a college football record.

Dobie then became the 16th head coach for the United States Naval Academy Midshipmen and held that position for three seasons, from 1917 to 1919. His coaching record at the Navy was  This ranks him 14th at the Navy in total wins and first at Navy in winning percentage (.857), as of the end of the 2007 season.

After coaching at Navy, Dobie won three national championships with Cornell, in 1921, 1922, and 1923 with Eddie Kaw and George Pfann.  After his first season, he signed a five-year contract. During his first championship season at Cornell, he collected his 100th career win, doing so in 108 games—an NCAA record that stood until 2014, when Lance Leipold reached the mark in his 106th game at Division III Wisconsin–Whitewater. Dobie remains the fastest coach to 100 wins in major-college history. His career coaching record was 182 wins, 45 losses, and 15 ties, a .780 percentage. Of the 33 years he coached, he had 14 undefeated seasons.

At Boston College at least, the best play of the Dobie system was a smash-through tackle. Dobie was inducted into the College Football Hall of Fame in 1951 as a charter member.

Dobie is buried at Lake View Cemetery in Ithaca, New York.

Head coaching record

Football

References

External links

 
 

1878 births
1948 deaths
American football ends
American football quarterbacks
Basketball coaches from Minnesota
Boston College Eagles football coaches
Cornell Big Red football coaches
Minnesota Golden Gophers football players
Navy Midshipmen football coaches
North Dakota State Bison football coaches
North Dakota State Bison men's basketball coaches
Washington Huskies football coaches
College Football Hall of Fame inductees
People from Hastings, Minnesota
Sportspeople from the Minneapolis–Saint Paul metropolitan area
Coaches of American football from Minnesota
Players of American football from Minnesota